During the 2000–01 English football season, Hull City Association Football Club competed in the Football League Third Division.

Final league table

Results
Hull City's score comes first

Legend

Football League Division Three

Football League Division Three play-offs

League Cup

FA Cup

Football League Trophy

Squad statistics
Appearances for competitive matches only

Squad

Left club during season

References
 Hull City 2000–01 at soccerbase.com (use drop down list to select relevant season)
 Hull squad
 Hull squad
 Hull squad numbers

Hull City A.F.C. seasons
Hull
2000s in Kingston upon Hull